These are the official results of the Men's 10,000 metres event at the 1990 European Championships in Split, Yugoslavia. The final was held at Stadion Poljud on 27 August 1990.

Medalists

Final

Participation
According to an unofficial count, 25 athletes from 16 countries participated in the event.

 (1)
 (1)
 (1)
 (1)
 (1)
 (3)
 (1)
 (1)
 (3)
 (1)
 (2)
 (1)
 (2)
 (1)
 (3)
 (2)

See also
 1988 Men's Olympic 10,000 metres (Seoul)
 1991 Men's World Championships 10,000 metres (Tokyo)
 1992 Men's Olympic 10,000 metres (Barcelona)

References

 Results

10000
10,000 metres at the European Athletics Championships
International athletics competitions hosted by Yugoslavia